This is a list of people who were born in, residents of, or otherwise closely associated with the city of Astana, Kazakhstan and its surrounding metropolitan statistical area.

Larisa Bergen, Olympic volleyball medalist
Alexander Kazantsev, science fiction writer
Yaroslava Shvedova, tennis player
Galina Voskoboeva, tennis player
Daneliya Tuleshova, singer

References

Astana